Intel Extreme Masters Season X – Cologne (or IEM Cologne) was an esports event held at the ESL Arena in Cologne from 18 to 20 December 2015.  There was only a tournament for League of Legends.

Final standings

References

Sport in Cologne
2015 in esports
2015 in German sport
League of Legends competitions
Intel Extreme Masters